Rival State is an alternative rock band based out of London, United Kingdom, which formed in New Plymouth, New Zealand in 2002. The band consists of members Salvi Stone, Nimal Fernando, Jo Einarsson, Stefan Einarsson and Valdi Einarsson.

The band released their debut album Apollo Me on 12 October 2012 in New Zealand, where it reached No 1 on the Top 20 New Zealand Album Charts and No 10 on the New Zealand Top 40 Album Charts.

In 2014 the band relocated to London, where they released their Youth Tax EP on 22 October 2014.

Discography

Studio albums

EPs
 Gutter Mouth EP (2015)
 Youth Tax EP (2014)

Singles
 "Impulses" (2016)
 "Modern Living" (2015)
 "Keepsake" (2015)
 "Sleep Talker" (2014)
 "Aces" (2014)

Band members
Current Band Members
Nimal Fernando - guitar, backing vocals (2002 – present)
Jo Einarsson - guitar (2002 – present)
Stefan Einarsson - bass guitar (2002 – present)
Valdimar Einarsson - drums (2012 – present)
Salvi Stone - Lead vocalist (2016–present)
Ex Band Members

 Luke Van Hoof - lead vocals, guitar (2005 – 2015)

References

External links 
 

Musical groups established in 2002
New Zealand alternative rock groups